1997 saw many sequels and prequels in video games, such as Final Fantasy VII, Castlevania: Symphony of the Night, GoldenEye 007, Star Fox 64, Tomb Raider II, Ultima Online, and Virtua Striker 2, along with new titles such as Everybody's Golf, I.Q.: Intelligent Qube, PaRappa the Rapper, Oddworld: Abe's Oddysee, Gran Turismo, Diablo, Grand Theft Auto and Fallout.

Sony's PlayStation was the year's best-selling video game console worldwide for the second year in a row, while also being the annual best-selling console in Japan for the first time (overtaking the Game Boy and Sega Saturn). The year's best-selling home video game worldwide was Squaresoft's Final Fantasy VII for the PlayStation, while the year's highest-grossing arcade games in Japan were Sega's Virtua Fighter 3 and Print Club 2.

Events
March 6 - Sega opens Sega World Sydney in Australia. It is the second Sega World park to open outside of Japan, with the first opening as part of the London Trocadero the previous year. 
June 19–21 – The 3rd annual E3 is held in Atlanta, Georgia, United States.
 October:
 Video game retailer FuncoLand opens its first Greater Cincinnati locations.
 4 – Gunpei Yokoi (1941–1997) dies after a double car accident.
November – Interactive Entertainment Merchants Association (IEMA) launched.
 December 16 – A scene from the Pokémon anime (based upon the highly successful games) causes 685 Japanese children to have seizures. Nintendo makes a statement proclaiming the safety of the Pokémon games from fear that the games would cause a similar effect, the episode to be permanently removed from circulation, and the featured Pokémon in the episode (Porygon) has not made an appearance in the Pokémon anime since.
TSR, Inc., the owner of the Dungeons & Dragons tabletop role-playing game, was acquired by Wizards of the Coast.
3D Realms begins production of Duke Nukem Forever, winner of numerous vaporware awards.
The gaming portal Cool Math Games went online for the first time.

Hardware
March 1 – The Nintendo 64 is released in Europe and Australia
October 20 – Nintendo releases the New-style Super NES, a remodeled version of the Super NES, in North America.
Junny releases PlayStation development software for PC
Tiger Electronics releases the Game.com

Discontinued
Sega announces that the Sega Mega Drive (Genesis) has been discontinued.
Sega Game Gear discontinued.

Top-rated games

Game of the Year awards 
The following titles won Game of the Year awards for 1997.

Critically acclaimed titles

Famitsu Platinum Hall of Fame 
The following video game releases in 1995 entered Famitsu magazine's "Platinum Hall of Fame" for receiving Famitsu scores of at least 35 out of 40.

Metacritic and GameRankings 
Metacritic (MC) and GameRankings (GR) are online aggregators of video game journalism reviews. Note that their coverage of print magazines at the time was limited, with numerous print magazines not listed on their sites.

Financial performance

Highest-grossing arcade games in Japan 
In Japan, the following titles were the highest-grossing arcade games of 1997.

Best-selling video game consoles

Best-selling home video games
Final Fantasy VII was the best-selling home video game worldwide in 1997. It sold more than  copies worldwide by 1998, becoming the best-selling PlayStation game up until then.

The following titles were the top ten best-selling home video games (console games or computer games) of 1997 in Japan and the United States.

Japan
In Japan, the following titles were the top ten best-selling home video games of 1997.

United States
In the United States, the following titles were the top ten best-selling home video games of 1997.

Europe
In Europe, the following titles were the top-selling home video games of each month in 1997.

Notable releases

Business
Activision acquires CentreSoft Ltd. and Raven Software
Electronic Arts Inc. acquires Maxis
GameTek filed for Chapter 11 bankruptcy and closed its doors in July 1998
2015, Inc. founded
4D Rulers Software, Inc. founded
September – 4HEAD Studios created
Bungie West formed by Bungie
Conspiracy Entertainment Corporation founded
Crave Entertainment, Inc. formed
August – Human Head Studios, Inc. formed
Illusion Softworks, a.s. founded
April 15 – Irem Software Engineering Inc. founded
Irrational Games LLC founded
Mythic Entertainment renames itself from Interworld Productions after name dispute with another "Interworld" company
THQ renamed from Toy Headquarters, Inc.
Warthog PLC founded

Lawsuits
 Nintendo vs Games City: Nintendo sues Games City for selling the Game Doctor and Doctor V64 backup devices for the SNES and N64 consoles. Nintendo wins the suit.
 Nintendo vs Prima Publishing: Nintendo sues Prima over copyrights to maps of the N64 video game GoldenEye 007. Nintendo loses the suit.
 Nintendo vs Sony Video Games: Nintendo sues Sony over copyrights about Mario games.

See also
1997 in games

References

External links

 
Video games by year